Transformers: Devastation is an action hack and slash video game based on the Transformers franchise developed by PlatinumGames and published by Activision. It was released on PlayStation 3, PlayStation 4, Windows, Xbox 360, and Xbox One in October 2015.

Devastation was the final game released under Activision's 2006 licensing agreement with Hasbro. Following the deal's expiration, the game was removed from sale via digital storefronts in December 2017, alongside other Transformers games published by Activision.

Gameplay
Transformers: Devastation is an action game similar to PlatinumGames' other titles (e.g. Bayonetta). Players control one of five Autobots: Optimus Prime, Bumblebee, Sideswipe, Wheeljack, and Grimlock, as they battle against Decepticons and Insecticons who stand in their way. Each of the Autobots are able to use a variety of melee attacks and ranged weapons, and are able to transform into vehicle mode at any time. Similar to Bayonetta, successfully dodging attacks activates Focus, which slows down time around the player, allowing them to counterattack their opponents. Each Autobot also has a unique special ability and a powerful Overdrive attack that can be performed with enough energy.

The game consists of seven chapters, which are each split up into several missions, including some optional side-missions. Players are ranked on each mission based on their overall performance. Players can earn credits and gain new weapons by defeating enemies, destroying certain objects, and solving puzzles hidden across each chapter. Credits can be used to purchase new items, moves, and weapons, forge T.E.C.H. to grant passive stat boosts, synthesize weapons to make them stronger, or increase the stats of each Autobot. Special collectibles can also be found in each chapter that unlock character and concept artwork. The game features multiple levels of difficulty, with more unlocked upon clearing the game multiple times. An additional Challenge Mode offers 50 stand-alone missions.

Plot
In New York City, a swarm of Insecticons and giant metal claws emerge from below, wreaking havoc. The Autobots: Optimus Prime, Sideswipe, Bumblebee, Wheeljack, and Grimlock arrive to investigate, battling Megatron and the Constructicons, who form Devastator. Megatron escapes into a hatch leading underground and reveals the attacks are the automatic defenses of the Proudstar, an Autobot ship which crashed on Earth millions of years ago that Megatron now controls, and announces his plans to use the Insecticons to cyberform the Earth, turning it into metal and creating a new Cybertron.

Optimus Prime explains that the Proudstar, captained by Nova Prime, was a ship meant to convert uninhabited planets into ones suitable to support Cybertronian life, and that its Ferrotaxis supercomputer contains a record of Cybertron's history and culture which had been lost during the Great War. Entering the ship, the Autobots fight off Soundwave and attempt to access the plasma core powering the Proudstar and the Insecticons, but the security system ejects the core from the ship. Emerging, the Autobots learn the core's location from Thundercracker and follow the trail. While they are distracted by fighting Blitzwing, Starscream arrives to take the core back to the Decepticons, but loses control of it due to a storm and crash-lands. The Autobots race Motormaster to the core, but find it damaged and at risk of an extinction-level explosion. Before they can shut it down, the rest of the Stunticons arrive and form Menasor. The combiner throws the core to Megatron, who takes it to Cybertron to be properly repaired.

The Autobots follow the Decepticons through the Space Bridge, but are delayed by Starscream and Shockwave, arriving too late to catch Megatron. Conversing with Shockwave, Optimus discovers that during the Proudstars voyage, Nova Prime and the crew were corrupted by Unicron and had begun to cyberform inhabited planets as well, planning to do the same to Earth before they crashed. Returning to the Proudstar, the Autobots try once again to disable the core, but it ruptures and becomes inaccessible, leaving the Ferrotaxis, now in Megatron's possession, as the only way to stop the cyberforming process and keep the plasma core from exploding. The group head for the Proudstars control room, fighting off the Decepticon forces as they ascend. Megatron escapes, ordering Devastator and Menasor to finish them, but the Autobots defeat them and follow Megatron, fighting him for the Ferrotaxis.

As he is defeated, Megatron fires the Ferrotaxis from his cannon into orbit and a swarm of Insecticons chase it. Optimus rides on one of the Insecticons into space after it, with Megatron in pursuit. The two engage in a final battle above the Earth, with Optimus emerging victorious, but cannot shut down the Insecticons due to Megatron's tampering. Left with no choice, Optimus destroys the Ferrotaxis, stopping the cyberforming and preventing the plasma core's detonation. As he falls back to Earth, Optimus declares Earth is now their true home, and they must protect it at all costs. Later, with Defensor and Superion's support, Optimus commissions plans for the Optimus Maximus project.

In a post-credits scene, aboard the Proudstar, Nova Prime is seen awakening from stasis.

Development
The game is part of the Transformers: Generations line, though its visual design is most strongly inspired by the original Transformers TV series with elements from both the IDW comic series and the Combiner Wars toyline. The game's story is written by former Transformers comic writer and editor Andy Schmidt. Several of the surviving voice actors from the original show reprised their roles, including Peter Cullen (Optimus Prime), Dan Gilvezan (Bumblebee), Michael Bell (Sideswipe and Scrapper), Gregg Berger (Grimlock and Long Haul), and Frank Welker (Megatron and Soundwave). Original music was composed by The Transformers: The Movie composer Vince DiCola and Angry Birds Transformers co-composer Kenny Meriedeth.

A downloadable content bundle containing character skins based on Nemesis Prime, Red Alert, and Goldfire, along with three additional weapons, was offered as a pre-order incentive. This bundle was later made available for separate purchase.

Reception

Transformers: Devastation received "generally favorable" reviews, according to video game review aggregator Metacritic. Critics praised the game's nostalgia, graphics, and gameplay, while criticisms were directed towards the repetition, frustrating camera controls, and the game's short length.

GameSpot's Scott Butterworth stated that "Devastation recaptures [the Transformers franchise's] spirit and presents it anew."

Mike Fahey of Kotaku considers the game to be an answer to his 14-year-old inner child's Christmas list, saying that he "downloaded the game, started it up and spent several hours grinning like an idiot." He praises the gameplay as "brutal, lightning-fast war" in a "beautiful symphony of destruction" across a secret-packed "sprawling city map", with a "satisfying combat system that rewards timing and tenacity" based upon "silky-smooth melee combos". However, he found the camera system to be "a mess" and the gameplay to be repetitive. He summarized it as "the closest gaming has come to a playable Generation One Transformers cartoon".

Giving a score of 6.5 out of 10, Justin McElroy of Polygon called PlatinumGames "one of the industry’s best action developers" and called the game "Platinum’s love letter to old school Transformers". He said the game's "numerous shortcomings will likely warn away all but the most diehard G1 fans", who are nonetheless "in for a treat". He found frustration in the camera manipulation, the melee button-mashing, and the boss battles, concluding that the player's "only meaningful interaction with the world of Transformers Devastation is beating the living hell out of a whole lot of robots in disguise."

Giving a 7.7 out of 10, Jose Otero of IGN stated that the "high-octane action is a rad, over-the-top direction".

Destructoid awarded the game a score of 8.5 out of 10 and called it "charming", saying that it is "[n]ot perfect, but it's easy to ignore the rough spots when faced with so many engaging design decisions and entertaining moments. A memorable game that's hard not to like and recommend to others."

References

External links
 

2015 video games
Action video games
Activision games
Hack and slash games
PlatinumGames games
PlayStation 3 games
PlayStation 4 games
Science fiction video games
Single-player video games
Devastation
Video games about mecha
Video games developed in Japan
Video games scored by Tetsuya Shibata
Video games set in New York City
Video games set in the United States
Video games with cel-shaded animation
Xbox 360 games
Xbox One games
Windows games